Ekallulik Island is an uninhabited island in the Qikiqtaaluk Region of Nunavut, Canada. It is located in Baffin Island's Cumberland Sound. Imigen Island, Ivisa Island, Kaigosuit Islands, Kudjak Island, and Saunik Island are in the vicinity.

References

External links 
 Ekallulik Island in the Atlas of Canada - Toporama; Natural Resources Canada

Islands of Baffin Island
Islands of Cumberland Sound
Uninhabited islands of Qikiqtaaluk Region